Stephen Lovely (born 1966, Dallas, Texas) is an American novelist and educator. He attended Kenyon College and the Iowa Writers' Workshop, where he studied with Deborah Eisenberg, Margot Livesey, Ethan Canin, and Frank Conroy. His first novel, Irreplaceable, was published by Hyperion/Voice in 2009 and translated into German, Dutch, and Chinese. Irreplaceable received the Dana Award for the Novel and a James Michener-Copernicus Society of America Award. Since 2005 Stephen has been the director of the Iowa Young Writers' Studio, a creative writing program for high school students at The University of Iowa. He lives in Iowa City.

Published works

References

21st-century American novelists
American male novelists
Living people
Kenyon College alumni
Iowa Writers' Workshop alumni
University of Iowa staff
1966 births
21st-century American male writers